PSLS stands for Persatuan Sepak bola Lhokseumawe (en: Football Association of Lhokseumawe). PSLS Lhokseumawe is an Indonesian football club based in Lhokseumawe, Aceh. They currently compete in the Liga 3.

Epithet
 Pasai Warrior
Since the first Lhokseumawe is from Samudera Pasai Sultanate dominate Strait of Malacca and has great strength. Because of this PSLS Lhokseumawe given the nickname Pasai Warriors.

 The Malacca Tiger
Since Samudera Pasai Sultanate dominate Strait of Malacca so strong that in dubbed "Tiger of Malacca". Therefore, PSLS also nicknamed The Malacca Tiger, in order to be a strong club in Aceh, also in Indonesian football.

Supporter
Paseemania are loyal supporters of the club PSLS Lhokseumawe.

References

External links
Club logo
PSLS Lhokseumawe at Liga-Indonesia.co.id
 

Football clubs in Indonesia
Football clubs in Aceh
Association football clubs established in 1962
1962 establishments in Indonesia